Bellaccord Electro, generally known as Bellaccord, was the largest record label in Latvia existing in 1931–1950, then renamed.

History 

The label was founded in 1931 by Helmars Rudzitis, owner of the publishing house Grāmatu Draugs (Friend of the book), who organized recording and pressing facilities in Riga at Kalnciema ielā, 40 (the building still exists). A subsidiary pressing facility was organized in Estonia.

The company was nationalized in October 1940, after the annexation of Latvia by the Soviet Union. However the new director, Jēkabs Riekstiņš, soon hired the former owner to manage the factory. Records pressed during this period were marked by letters "N. U." (Nationalized enterprise) in the upper part of labels.

Since May 21, 1941, the factory was planned to be renamed to Latvijas skaņuplašu fabrika (Latvian factory of gramophone records), however there is no evidence that this decision had been implemented before Riga became occupied by German troops in July.

Under the German administration, the factory was re-privatized on March 1, 1942, and returned to Helmars Rudzitis. It was operating until 1944.

After the return of Soviet authorities, the factory was re-opened in April 1945 and kept using the original Bellaccord's name until 1949 (since 1948 — without the word Electro on the labels).

In 1950 it was renamed Rīgas skaņuplašu fabrika / Рижский завод грампластинок (i.e. Riga's gramophone records factory), then Baltija (1957), Līgo (1958–61) and finally Melodija (1961–64).

In 1964, almost all Soviet recording and pressing facilities were united under the umbrella label Мелодия (Melodiya), however names of particular factories (including Riga's one) remained on the labels, although in small print.

After the break-up of the USSR, the Riga's factory became owned by Alexander Kutikov's company Sintez Records and renamed RiTonis (1992). The last record was issued in 1993. Bankrupted in 1999.

Indirect descendants 
In mid-1950s, a series of 100 Bellaccord Electro records was reissued under the original label in USA and Australia.

As a commemoration to pre-WWII Estonian branch of the Bellaccord Electro, in 1958–1972 in Stockholm, Sweden, there was a label Bellacord (spelled with one "c") specializing in ethnical Estonian music.

References

External links 
 Evolution of the Bellaccord Electro and Riga's factory label design in 1945–-1952
 Collection of Bellaccord Electro records in the Latvian National Digital Library
 Collection of Bellaccord Electro records in www.russian-records.com

Latvian record labels
Companies nationalised by the Soviet Union